Ryan John "Rowdy" Tellez (born March 16, 1995) is an American professional baseball first baseman for the Milwaukee Brewers of Major League Baseball (MLB). He previously played in MLB for the Toronto Blue Jays.

In 2013, Tellez was both a Baseball America and a Rawlings First Team High School All-American. He was drafted by the Blue Jays in the 30th round of the 2013 Major League Baseball draft. In 2015, Tellez was a Midwest League All-Star, and named to the Arizona Fall League (AFL) All-Prospect Team and an AFL Rising Star. The following year, he was named an Eastern League All-Star, an MiLB.com Toronto Blue Jays Organization All-Star, and a Baseball America Double-A All-Star.

He made his major league debut in 2018, and is the only player since 1913 to hit seven doubles in his first seven major league games.

Early life
Born in Sacramento, California, he is the oldest child of Greg and Lori (née Bernick) Tellez. He is Jewish. His father said of him before he was born: "We didn't know the sex and we didn't want to know, and we stayed away from calling him 'Baby' or 'It.' But he was so active in there, moving around all of the time in the womb, that we ended up calling him 'Baby Rowdy', and it stuck. Now he's just 'Rowdy', and that's how everybody knows him." Tellez is of Mexican descent through his father, and his paternal grandfather played in the Mexican Baseball League.

High school
Tellez attended Elk Grove High School. There, he was a 2013 Baseball America High School All-American, 2013 Rawlings First Team All-American, and 2013 Rawlings/Perfect Game All-Region First Team – California.

He was drafted by the Blue Jays in the 30th round of the 2013 Major League Baseball draft. Entering the draft, Tellez was ranked as the 59th-best player available by Baseball America, but he was passed over for a number of rounds as he had accepted a scholarship to attend the University of Southern California. He signed with the Blue Jays for an $850,000 signing bonus, which at the time was the most ever paid to a post-10th-round pick in the two years since the new draft rule was put in place.

Professional career

Minor leagues

2013–15
Tellez was assigned to the Rookie-level Gulf Coast League Blue Jays for the 2013 season, and batted .234 with two home runs and 20 runs batted in (RBIs) in 34 games. Baseball America rated him the best power hitter in the Blue Jays minor league organization. He played most of the 2014 season with the Bluefield Blue Jays of the Appalachian League, and earned a late-season promotion to the Class-A Lansing Lugnuts of the Midwest League. In total, Tellez played 65 games in 2014, and batted .305 with six home runs and 43 RBIs.

Tellez opened the 2015 season with Lansing, and was Midwest League Player of the Week for the week ended May 18. He was named a Midwest League midseason All-Star. At that time, he led the league in runs batted in, with 41. Tellez was promoted to the Dunedin Blue Jays of the Advanced-A Florida State League in late June, and hit three home runs in his first four games with the team, earning a spot on MLBPipeline's Prospect Team of the Week and being named Florida State League Player of the Week for the week ended June 29. He ended the 2015 season on the disabled list. Tellez set several career-highs in 2015, playing in 103 games and batting .289 with 14 home runs and 77 RBIs. In the offseason, he played 21 games with the Salt River Rafters of the Arizona Fall League, batting .293 and leading the team with four home runs and 17 RBIs. He was named to the AFL All-Prospect Team, and AFL Rising Stars.

2016–18
Tellez was invited to Major League spring training in 2016. He was assigned to the Double-A New Hampshire Fisher Cats to open the 2016 minor league season. Tellez was named an Eastern League mid-season All-Star, and one of 13 Full-Season Eastern League All-Stars. Tellez had a stellar 2016 season, posting career-highs in almost every offensive category. In 124 games, he hit .297 (10th in the Eastern League) with a .389 on-base percentage (2nd), .530 slugging percentage (3rd), 23 home runs (4th), 63 walks (4th), 81 RBIs (6th), 71 runs (6th), and 29 doubles (tied for 8th). He was named an MiLB.com Toronto Blue Jays Organization All-Star, and a Baseball America Double-A All-Star.

Tellez was named the sixth-best first base prospect by Major League Baseball, and Toronto's 5th-best prospect by MLB Pipeline, heading into the 2017 season. In spring training, Jays manager John Gibbons described him as being the closest prospect in the team's minor league system to being ready for the Major Leagues. Tellez was assigned to the Triple-A Buffalo Bisons in late March. In his first game for the Bisons, Tellez hit two home runs to lead the team to a 4–2 victory over the Scranton/Wilkes-Barre RailRiders. From that point on, however, Tellez struggled in Triple-A. In 122 games, he hit .222 with six home runs and 56 runs batted in. On November 20, 2017, Tellez was added to Toronto's 40-man roster.

Tellez began the 2018 season playing again for the Bisons. He was ranked 29th on MLB's 2018 Top 30 Blue Jays prospects list. He played in 112 games and hit .270/.340/.425 with 13 home runs and 50 RBIs. On September 4, Tellez was called up by the Blue Jays.

Toronto Blue Jays

2018
On September 5, 2018, Tellez made his Major League debut with the Blue Jays. In his first at bat, pinch hitting, he hit the first pitch he saw for a double against the Tampa Bay Rays.

Over his first three career games, Tellez hit six doubles, becoming the first Major League player since 1913 to do so. His six doubles represented the first time in the live-ball era that a Major League player debuted with three consecutive doubles, were the first time since Joe DiMaggio in 1936 that an American League rookie hit six doubles in a three-game span, and tied the record set by Chris Dickerson in 2008 for the most extra-base hits in a player's first three games. Tellez then became the only player since 1913 to hit seven doubles in his first seven major league games. In his first 40 plate appearances he had 10 extra base hits, tying former catcher Taylor Teagarden for the most by any ballplayer since 1913. 

For the 2018 season, he batted .314/.329/.614. He hit nine doubles, four home runs, and 14 RBIs in 70 at-bats.

2019
In 2019, Tellez made the Blue Jays' Opening Day roster. On April 11, he hit a home run with a 115.2 mph exit velocity, the highest for a Toronto Blue Jays home run in the Statcast era (since 2015). On April 23, he became the fifth-youngest Blue Jay of all time to hit a grand slam, at 24 years and 38 days. He became the first player in Blue Jays history to hit 13 home runs in his first 65 major league games, and 17 home runs in his first 85 games.

He played 26 games with Buffalo in 2019, batting .366/.450/.688 with 7 home runs and 21 RBIs in 93 at-bats.

For the season with Toronto, he batted .227/.293/.449 with 21 home runs and 51 RBIs in 370 at-bats. Tellez became the third rookie in Blue Jays history to hit 21 or more home runs, joining Eric Hinske (24 in 2002) and J.P. Arencibia (23 in 2011). He hit a ball with an exit velocity of 115.2 mph, in the top 3% of the highest exit velocities of batted balls by major leaguers in 2019.

2020
In the COVID-19-shortened 2020 season, Tellez batted .283/.346/.540. He hit eight home runs and 23 RBIs, with 20 strikeouts in 113 at-bats, as on defense he played error-free baseball. 

His strikeout percentage decreased 12.7% from the prior year, the greatest decrease among major league hitters. Tellez drove in runs at a rate of 4.91 AB/RBI (10th-best in the AL). On August 20 he hit a home run with an exit velocity of 117.4 mph, the highest for a home run by a Blue Jay in the Statcast era (since 2015), and the third-highest exit velocity of any batted ball for all major leaguers in 2020 (behind Pete Alonso (118.4) and Gary Sanchez (117.5)).

Milwaukee Brewers

2021
On July 6, 2021, Tellez was traded to the Milwaukee Brewers in exchange for pitchers Trevor Richards and Bowden Francis.

In the 2021 regular season for the Brewers, Tellez batted .272/.333/.481. He hit 10 doubles, seven home runs, and 28 RBIs in 158 at bats. 

He hit a two-run home run in the first game of the 2021 NLDS off Charlie Morton, providing the winning margin as the Brewers went on to beat the Atlanta Braves 2–1. He hit another two-run home run in Game 4, though the Brewers lost that game and the series to the eventual World Series champion Braves.

2022
On May 4, 2022, Tellez set a Milwaukee Brewers record with eight RBIs in one game, doing so with a double and two home runs in an 18–4 win over the Cincinnati Reds.

On May 8, 2022, Tellez received the NL Player of the Week Award.

In 2022 he batted .219/.306/.461 in 529 at bats, with 35 home runs (5th in the NL), 89 RBIs, 9 intentional walks (4th), and 15.1 at bats per home run (3rd). The maximum exit velocity of balls he hit was 116.9 mph, 7th-highest in major league baseball. On defense, his .998 fielding percentage was second-best among NL first basemen.

2023
On January 13, 2023, Tellez agreed to a one-year, $4.95 million contract with the Brewers, avoiding salary arbitration.

Personal life
Tellez's mother, Lori, was diagnosed with stage IV melanoma in late 2016 and later she battled brain cancer. She died on August 18, 2018, just over two weeks before his major league debut.

See also
List of select Jewish baseball players

References

External links

1995 births
Living people
American expatriate baseball players in Canada
American sportspeople of Mexican descent
Baseball players from Sacramento, California
Bluefield Blue Jays players
Buffalo Bisons (minor league) players
Dunedin Blue Jays players
Estrellas Orientales players
American expatriate baseball players in the Dominican Republic
Gulf Coast Blue Jays players
Jewish American baseball players
Jewish Major League Baseball players
Lansing Lugnuts players
Major League Baseball first basemen
Milwaukee Brewers players
Nashville Sounds players
New Hampshire Fisher Cats players
Salt River Rafters players
Toronto Blue Jays players
21st-century American Jews
2023 World Baseball Classic players